"Angel of Mine" is a song by British R&B girl group Eternal from their first compilation album, Greatest Hits (1997). It was written by Rhett Lawrence and Travon Potts, produced by Lawrence, and released on 29 September 1997. The song became Eternal's 12th and final top-10 hit on the UK Singles Chart, peaking at number four. "Angel of Mine" was the ensemble's final single as a three-piece, as after its release, Kéllé Bryan left the group. In June 2019, "Angel of Mine" was ranked at number 91 on the  Official Charts Company's "Top 100 Girl Band Singles of the Last 25 Years".

In 1998, American singer Monica released a cover version that topped the US Billboard Hot 100 chart for four weeks and peaked at number two on the US Billboard Hot R&B/Hip-Hop Songs chart. It was certified platinum by the Recording Industry Association of America (RIAA) in 1999.

Critical reception
Pan-European magazine Music & Media wrote, "With this lush number, Eternal confirm their status as the U.K.'s queens of the R&B ballad, at the same time offering a preview of their imminent Greatest Hits album, which is due for release on October 20." British magazine Music Week rated "Angel of Mine" five out of five, picking it as Single of the Week. It was described as a "lush, touching ballad, highlighting their vocal prowess", and, "It cannot fail." The magazine's Alan Jones declared it as "particularly uplifting and enjoyable."

Track listings

Credits and personnel
Credits are adapted from the liner notes of Greatest Hits.

Studios
 Recorded at Sound Gallery Studios (Los Angeles) and H-2-O Enterprises (London, England)
 Mixed at Sound Gallery Studios (Los Angeles)

Personnel

 Rhett Lawrence – writing, all instruments, production, programming, arrangement, mixing
 Travon Potts – writing, all instruments, programming, arrangement
 Easther Bennett – lead vocals, background vocals
 Vernie Bennett – background vocals
 Kéllé Bryan – background vocals

 Maxx – mixing
 Dave Pensado – mixing
 Eric White – engineering
 Bryan Golder – engineering
 Simon Bohannon – engineering
 William Catterson – assistant engineering

Charts

Weekly charts

Year-end charts

Certifications

Monica version

American R&B singer Monica covered "Angel of Mine" for her second studio album, The Boy Is Mine (1998). On her version, Rodney "Darkchild" Jerkins replaced Lawrence as the song's producer. Jerkins also oversaw mixing along with Dexter Simmons, while recording was handled by Rico Lumpkins. Still credited as a songwriter, Lawrence slightly altered the lyrics for Monica at the besthest of Arista Records head Clive Davis. Co-writer Potts commented on Monica's rendition: "Rodney [Jerkins] did an incredible job on the production, and then Monica's interpretation, vocally, was incredible as well. She has such a big voice for someone so young." Monica herself described the song about "having a friend that she falls in with, which being human is very easy to do."

Critical reception
"Angel of Mine" was positively received by Chuck Taylor of Billboard, who called the song "unbelievable" and "absolutely stunning." He also noted its commercial potential, claiming "this song has #1 stamped across its heart."

Commercial performance
"Angel of Mine" was  released on 9 November 1998 as the third single from The Boy Is Mine. Following the success of her previous singles, "The Boy Is Mine" and "The First Night", the song became the album's third consecutive release to reach the top of the US Billboard Hot 100. It also reached number two on the US Billboard Hot R&B/Hip-Hop Songs charts, becoming the seventh domestic top-10 hit of Monica's career. "Angel of Mine" was eventually ranked number three on Billboards Hot 100 1999 year-end charts, and reached number 62 on its decade-end chart. In addition, the song reached number 10 in Canada, the top 20 in Australia, and the top 40 in New Zealand.

Music video
The accompanying music video for "Angel of Mine" was directed by Diane Martel and features Tyrese Gibson as Monica's love interest.

Track listings

Credits and personnel
Credits are adapted from the liner notes of The Boy Is Mine.

 Monica Arnold – vocals
 Rodney Jerkins – mixing, production
 Rhett Lawrence – writer
 Rico Lumpkins – recording

 Tomi Martin – guitar
 Travon Potts – writer
 Dexter Simmons – mixing

Charts

Weekly charts

Year-end charts

Decade-end charts

Certifications

References

External links
 Monica.com — official Monica site
 "Angel of Mine" - Eternal music video (Warner Music Group)
 Monica music videos — watch "Angel of Mine" at LAUNCHcast

1990s ballads
1997 singles
1997 songs
1998 singles
1999 singles
Arista Records singles
Billboard Hot 100 number-one singles
Contemporary R&B ballads
EMI Records singles
Eternal (band) songs
Monica (singer) songs
Music videos directed by Diane Martel
Pop ballads
Song recordings produced by Rhett Lawrence
Song recordings produced by Rodney Jerkins
Songs written by Rhett Lawrence
Songs written by Travon Potts